Quercus phillyreoides is a species of flowering plant in the genus Quercus, placed in subgenus Cerris and section Ilex.  It is evergreen, withstands frost and can be grown in hardiness zone 7. It is native to southern China, the Ryukyu Islands, and Japan, and has been introduced to Korea.

Uses 
The Japanese use Quercus phillyreoides or ubame oak to produce binchōtan, a traditional variety of vegetal activated carbon. It has found use as a street tree in a number of European cities.

References 

phillyreoides
Flora of South-Central China
Flora of Southeast China
Flora of the Ryukyu Islands
Flora of Japan
Plants described in 1859